Helen Elizabeth "Betsy" Nagelsen McCormack (born October 23, 1956) is an American former professional tennis player.

Career
Nagelsen was the world's top junior in 1973. She won the 1973 U.S. Champion Girls' 16 and under singles. She also won the USTA Girls' Sportsmanship Award in 1974. As a professional, she won the doubles championship at the 1978 and 1980 Australian Opens (with Renáta Tomanová and Martina Navratilova, respectively), and reached the singles final of the 1978 Australian Open, losing to Christine O'Neil. Over her 21-year career on the WTA Tour, Nagelsen won 26 doubles titles and four singles titles.

Nagelsen reached her career-high singles ranking by the end of 1981, when she became the world No. 23. She also reached a career-high ranking in doubles of No. 11 on March 4, 1988. She had career wins over Martina Navratilova, Arantxa Sánchez Vicario, Sue Barker, Pam Shriver, Claudia Kohde-Kilsch, Rosie Casals, Betty Stöve, and Sylvia Hanika. She was a four-time member of the U.S. Wightman Cup Team in 1974, 1985, 1988 and 1989.

After her retirement in 1996, Nagelsen became a commentator for ABC and ESPN in the United States and Australia's Nine Network. She married Mark McCormack, founder of the sports management group IMG. The couple donated money for the McCormack-Nagelsen Tennis Center at the College of William and Mary in Williamsburg, Virginia. The Intercollegiate Tennis Association's Women's Tennis Hall of Fame is located on the site.

Grand Slam finals

Singles: 1 (1 runner-up)

Doubles: 4 (2 titles, 2 runners-up)

Mixed Doubles: 1 (1 runner-up)

Grand Slam tournament performance timeline

Singles

Note: The Australian Open was held twice in 1977, in January and December.

See also
 Performance timelines for all female tennis players who reached at least one Grand Slam final

References

External links
 
 
 ITA Profile on William & Mary
 McCormack-Nagelsen Tennis Center on tribeathletics.com

1956 births
Living people
American female tennis players
Australian Open (tennis) champions
People from Maui
American people of German descent
Sportspeople from Orlando, Florida
Sportspeople from St. Petersburg, Florida
Tennis commentators
Tennis people from Florida
Grand Slam (tennis) champions in women's doubles
Tennis people from Hawaii
21st-century American women